Gregory Singkai (born 1935, in Koromira – 12 September 1996) was a Papua New Guinean clergyman and bishop for the Roman Catholic Diocese of Bougainville. He became ordained in 1966. He was appointed bishop in 1974. He died on 12 September 1996.

References 

20th-century Roman Catholic bishops in Papua New Guinea
1935 births
1996 deaths
Papua New Guinean Roman Catholic bishops
Roman Catholic bishops of Bougainville